Opium (Spanish: Opio) is a 1949 Mexican crime film directed by Ramón Peón.

The film's sets were designed by Ramón Rodríguez Granada.

Cast
 Carolina Barret 
 Chela Castro 
 Tito Junco
 Héctor Mateos 
 Gelacio Ponce 
 Juan Pulido 
 Rosita Quintana 
 Titina Romay 
 Fanny Schiller 
 Domingo Soler
 Eduardo Vivas 
 Mazando Yamada

References

Bibliography 
 Rogelio Agrasánchez. Carteles de la época de oro del cine mexicano. Archivo Fílmico Agrasánchez, 1997.

External links 
 

1949 films
1949 crime films
Mexican crime films
1940s Spanish-language films
Films directed by Ramón Peón
Mexican black-and-white films
Films about opium
Films about drugs
1940s Mexican films